United Ghettos of America is a soundtrack to accompany the DVD Documentary by the same name released by rapper Yukmouth in 2002 on Smoke-a-Lot/Rap-A-Lot Records.

Track listing

References

External links 
 Smokelotrecords.com Official Label Website

Yukmouth albums
West Coast hip hop soundtracks
2002 soundtrack albums
Documentary film soundtracks
Gangsta rap soundtracks